Vexillum (Vexillum) subdivisum, common name : the Costate Mitre, is a species of small sea snail, marine gastropod mollusk in the family Costellariidae, the ribbed miters.

Description
The shell size varies between 30 mm and 60 mm

Distribution
This species is distributed in the Indian Ocean along Mauritius and in the Pacific Ocean along Australia, Papua New Guinea and Okinawa.

References

 Michel, C. (1988). Marine molluscs of Mauritius. Editions de l'Ocean Indien. Stanley, Rose Hill. Mauritius
 Turner H. 2001. Katalog der Familie Costellariidae Macdonald, 1860. Conchbooks. 1–100-page(s): 62

External links
 
  Cernohorsky, Walter Oliver. The Mitridae of Fiji; The veliger vol. 8 (1965)

subdivisum
Gastropods described in 1791